Sir Edward O'Brien, 2nd Baronet (7 April 1705 – 26 November 1765) was an Irish politician and baronet.

Life
Born in England in 1705, he was the eldest surviving child of Lucius O'Brien (1675-1717 d.v.p) and Catherine Keightley (1676- c. 1733). He would be followed by a younger brother Thomas and two sisters Anne and Lucia, who both died as children. He inherited the baronetcy from his grandfather Sir Donough O'Brien, 1st Baronet as his own father had pre-deceased him. His maternal grandmother, Lady Frances Keightley (née Hyde) was the sister of Anne Hyde Duchess of York who in turn was the mother of Queen Mary II and Queen Anne. Edward was raised first in Ireland, before attending Oxford.

He entered the Irish House of Commons in 1727, sitting for Clare, the same constituency his grandfather had also represented, until his death in 1765.

Edward lived extravagantly and gambled heavily on horse races, destroying the wealth which his grandfather had so carefully built. When the last Earl of Thomond Henry O'Brien died he left his large estates to Murrough, the son of William O'Brien, 4th Earl of Inchiquin, with remainder to Percy Wyndham. Murrough in died in 1741 and the reversion became effective. When the Earl of Thomond was seeking an heir amongst his kinsmen, he could not select the Marshal of Thomond as he refused to turn Protestant. He did not choose Edward as his heir as he was living too extravagantly and thus left him out of his will. The fortunes of the Dromoland O'Briens would have been greatly enhanced had they inherited the Thomond estates.

Issue
He married Mary Hickman in 1726 and together they had eight children:
Sir Lucius O'Brien, 3rd Baronet.
Donough O'Brien, married Mary, daughter of Richard Henn of Paradise, County Clare. Progenitor of Canadian branch of the family.
Captain Edward O'Brien, married Charlotte, daughter of Thomas Hickman of Brickhill, County Clare and died in 1787.
Henrietta, died unmarried.
Anne, married Richard Dawson of Atherdee, brother of the 1st Viscount Cremorne.
Mary, who married John Quin of Rossbrien and died in 1782.
Catherine, who married Charles MacDonnell of New Hall (Killone).
Lucy O'Brien, married Thomas Arthur of Glanmore in 1766.

Ancestry

References

Further reading
 Wilson, Rachel, Elite Women in Ascendancy Ireland, 1690-1745: Imitation and Innovation (Boydell and Brewer, Woodbridge, 2015). 

Welcome to the O'Brien Clan – Sir Conor O'Brien
Historical Memoir of The O'Brien's by John O'Donoghue published 1860

Baronets in the Baronetage of Ireland
Irish MPs 1727–1760
Irish MPs 1761–1768
Members of the Parliament of Ireland (pre-1801) for County Clare constituencies
1705 births
1765 deaths
Edward
Politicians from County Clare